Share the Joy is the third studio album by American indie rock band Vivian Girls. It was released on April 12, 2011 by Polyvinyl Record Co. The album was produced by the band's lead singer and guitarist Cassie Ramone with Woods' Jarvis Taveniere, and was primarily recorded at Taveniere's studio Rear House.

Track listing

Personnel
Credits are adapted from the album's liner notes.

Vivian Girls
 Fiona Campbell – drums, percussion, vocals
 Katy Goodman – bass, vocals
 Cassie Ramone – guitar, lead vocals, production, artwork, layout

Additional personnel
 John Golden – mastering
 Ali Koehler – drums on "Death"
 Dave Seidel – celeste on "Light in Your Eyes"
 Jarvis Taveniere – organ, additional guitar, production, recording

Charts

References

External links
 

2011 albums
Vivian Girls albums
Polyvinyl Record Co. albums